Burg Kaisersberg is a castle in Styria, Austria.

References

External links

See also
List of castles in Austria

Castles in Styria